Lloyd Richard Jones (born 7 October 1995) is an English professional footballer who plays as a defender for EFL league one club Cambridge United .

Club career

Liverpool
Liverpool signed Lloyd Jones in May 2011 from the Plymouth Argyle for a sum of £150,000.

The large figure of Jones quickly became a regular starter for Liverpool's Under-21 squad during the 2012–13 season. He was rewarded with his good performances by earning a call up to the senior squad on 12 May 2013 for Liverpool's Premier League encounter against Fulham. He was an unused substitute in the 3–1 victory for Liverpool. 
In July 2013, he signed a 3-year professional deal with the club.

Jones captained the Reserve team for the latter part of the 2013–14 campaign & throughout the 2014–15 season.

Various loan spells
On 1 January 2015, Lloyd Jones signed a 6 weeks loan deal with Cheltenham Town along with fellow reserve teammates Kevin Stewart and Jack Dunn. He made his Cheltenham, and senior debut, on 3 January in a League Two match against Oxford United which saw Cheltenham win 2–1.

On 12 March 2015, Jones joined Accrington Stanley on a 6 weeks loan.

On 3 August 2015, Jones signed a season long loan with Blackpool. On 30 September 2015, he suffered a serious injury being out for 6 months injuring both knee & ankle in the same tackle.

On 6 August 2016, Jones signed new 2-year contract with Liverpool and on the same day, he was loaned to Swindon Town.

Luton Town
On 31 January 2018, Jones joined Luton Town for an undisclosed fee. He returned to Luton's League One rivals Plymouth Argyle on 31 January 2019 on loan until the end of 2018–19.

Northampton Town
Jones was loaned to League Two club Northampton Town on 31 January 2020 until the end of the 2019–20 season. His debut came a day later in a 1–0 win away to Macclesfield Town, which manager Keith Curle described as "a very solid performance". He made seven appearances by the time the season was suspended because of the COVID-19 pandemic in England. Northampton finished in seventh place on points per game, but with his Luton contract expiring at the end of June and another club showing an interest in signing him, Jones chose not to participate in the play-offs to avoid an injury. However, the proposed move fell through and Jones failed to find a club in the summer transfer window.

Northampton were promoted to League One with victory in the 2020 League Two play-off Final, and Jones returned to the club in October to train with them. As a result of English Football League rules restricting clubs in League One to 22-man squads, Northampton could only offer Jones a contract in December, after they were able to remove another player from their squad list. He re-signed for the club on 29 December on a contract until the end of the season. His first appearance after returning came later that day in a 3–1 home win over Gillingham, a result that ended a run of four consecutive defeats. After making six successive league starts and helping the team keep three clean sheets, manager Curle praised Jones' efforts to win back his trust. However, Northampton lost their next match 1–0 at home to Wigan Athletic, resulting in Curle being dismissed a day later with the club in 23rd place, and was replaced by caretaker manager Jon Brady. Jones had played every minute of Northampton's 16 league matches since rejoining the club by mid-March 2021, with the team keeping seven clean sheets, and was named as captain by Brady for the first time in a 2–1 away defeat to Charlton Athletic on 9 March.

Cambridge United

On 8 June 2021 Jones signed for newly promoted Cambridge United.

International career
Jones is eligible to represent his birth country England as well as Wales through his Welsh father. He made eleven appearances for the Welsh under-17s scoring once. He earned one cap for the Welsh U19s before switching allegiance to England in October 2013, having rejected a call-up to the Welsh U21s. He got called up for the England U19s for their 2014 UEFA European Under-19 Championship elite qualification matches in May 2014. Jones featured in all three matches. Four months later he made his debut for the U20s in a friendly against Romania. He has played four times for the U20s.

Career statistics

References

External links
Profile at the Northampton Town F.C. website
Profile at the Football Association website

1995 births
Living people
Footballers from Plymouth, Devon
English footballers
Wales youth international footballers
England youth international footballers
Association football defenders
Plymouth Argyle F.C. players
Liverpool F.C. players
Cheltenham Town F.C. players
Accrington Stanley F.C. players
Blackpool F.C. players
Swindon Town F.C. players
Luton Town F.C. players
Northampton Town F.C. players
Cambridge United F.C. players
English Football League players
English people of Welsh descent